Hobson is a former New Zealand parliamentary electorate. It existed from 1946 to 1978 and then from 1987 to 1996, and was represented by five Members of Parliament, four of whom represented the National Party. With the re-drawing of boundaries in the first MMP election in 1996, the seat was absorbed into the Northland and Whangarei electorates.

Population centres
The 1941 New Zealand census had been postponed due to World War II, so the 1946 electoral redistribution had to take ten years of population growth and movements into account. The North Island gained a further two electorates from the South Island due to faster population growth. The abolition of the country quota through the Electoral Amendment Act, 1945 reduced the number and increased the size of rural electorates. None of the existing electorates remained unchanged, 27 electorates were abolished, eight former electorates were re-established, and 19 electorates were created for the first time, including Hobson. The electorate was in the Northland Region, and in its original form included the following population centres: Ruawai, Dargaville, Kawakawa, Kaikohe, Kerikeri, Kaitaia, and Mangonui.

The electorate was abolished through the 1977 electoral redistribution. The area that it last covered was divided by the Bay of Islands and Kaipara electorates.

The 1987 electoral redistribution took the continued population growth in the North Island into account, and two additional general electorates were created, bringing the total number of electorates to 97. In the South Island, the shift of population to Christchurch had continued. Overall, three electorates were newly created, three electorates were recreated (including Hobson), and four electorates were abolished. All of those electorates were in the North Island. Changes in the South Island were restricted to boundary changes.

History
The first representative of the Hobson electorate was Sidney Smith, who had previously represented the Bay of Islands electorate. In the 1960 and 1963 elections, Vernon Cracknell of the Social Credit Party contested the Hobson electorate and placed second on both occasions, pushing the Labour Party candidate into third place. The area had previously been receptive to social credit theory; the Social Credit Party had placed second in the 1954 election.

Members of Parliament
Key

Election results

1975 election

1972 election

1969 election

1966 election

1963 election

1960 election

1957 election

1954 election

1951 election

Notes

References

Historical electorates of New Zealand
1946 establishments in New Zealand
1978 disestablishments in New Zealand
1987 establishments in New Zealand
1996 disestablishments in New Zealand